Crash Landing may refer to:

 Crash landing, emergency landing, an unplanned landing by an aircraft
 Crash Landing (1958 film), an American film featuring Gary Merrill
 Crash Landing (1999 film), a Chinese thriller film
 Crash Landing (Jimi Hendrix album)
 Crash-Landing (Die Toten Hosen album)
 Crash Landing, a novel by Robert Muchamore in the Rock War series
 "Crash Landing", an episode of Ice Pilots NWT

See also
 Crash Landing on You, a Korean drama series
 Landing (disambiguation)
 Emergency Landing (disambiguation)